Mount Meru (also Sumeru (Sanskrit) or Sineru (Pāli) or Kangrinboqe) is the name of the central world-mountain in Buddhist cosmology.  Etymologically, the proper name of the mountain is Meru (Pāli Meru), to which is added the approbatory prefix su-, resulting in the meaning "excellent Meru" or "wonderful Meru".

The concept of Sumeru is closely related to the central Mount Meru of Hindu cosmology, but it differs from the Hindu concept in several particulars.

Characteristics

According to Vasubandhu's  (philosophical writings), Sumeru is 80,000 yojanas tall.  The exact measure of one yojana is uncertain, but some accounts put it at about 24,000 feet, or approximately 4-1/2 miles, but other accounts put it at about 7-9 miles. It also descends beneath the surface of the surrounding waters to a depth of 80,000 yojanas, being founded upon the basal layer of Earth.  Sumeru is often used as a simile for both size and stability in Buddhist texts.

Sumeru is said to be shaped like an hourglass, with a top and base of 80,000 yojanas square, but narrowing in the middle (i.e., at a height of 40,000 yojanas) to 20,000 yojanas square.

Sumeru is the polar center of a mandala-like complex of seas and mountains.  The square base of Sumeru is surrounded by a square moat-like ocean, which is in turn surrounded by a ring (or rather square) wall of mountains, which is in turn surrounded by a sea, each diminishing in width and height from the one closer to Sumeru. There are seven seas and seven surrounding mountain-walls, until one comes to the vast outer sea which forms most of the surface of the world, in which the known continents are merely small islands.  The known world, which is on the continent of Jambudvipa, is directly south of Sumeru.

The 80,000 yojana square top of Sumeru constitutes the  "heaven" (devaloka), which is the highest plane in direct physical contact with the earth.  The next 40,000 yojanas below this heaven consist of sheer precipice, narrowing in like an inverted mountain until it is 20,000 yojanas square at a heigh of 40,000 yojanas above the sea.

From this point Sumeru expands again, going down in four terraced ledges, each broader than the one above.  The first terrace constitutes the "heaven" of the Four Great Kings and is divided into four parts, facing north, south, east and west.  Each section is governed by one of the Four Great Kings, who faces outward toward the quarter of the world that he supervises.

40,000 yojanas is also the height at which the Sun and Moon circle Sumeru in a clockwise direction.   This rotation explains the alteration of day and night; when the Sun is north of Sumeru, the shadow of the mountain is cast over the continent of Jambudvīpa, and it is night there; at the same time it is noon in the opposing northern continent of Uttarakuru, dawn in the eastern continent of Pūrvavideha, and dusk in the western continent of Aparagodānīya.  Half a day later, when the Sun has moved to the south, it is noon in Jambudvīpa, dusk in Pūrvavideha, dawn in Aparagodānīya, and midnight in Uttarakuru.

The next three terraces down the slopes of Sumeru are each longer and broader by a factor of two.

The names and dimensions of the terraces on the lower slopes of Sumeru are given below:

Below Sumeru, in the seas around it, is the abode of the Asuras who are at war with the  gods.

Abandonment 
Certain traditional Buddhist ideas about the world are incompatible with modern science and have been abandoned by numerous modern Buddhists. One of the most well known of these ideas is Mount Meru. According to Donald S. Lopez Jr., "the human realm that Buddhist texts describe is a flat earth, or perhaps more accurately a flat ocean, its waters contained by a ring of iron mountains. In that ocean is a great central mountain, surrounded in the four cardinal directions by island continents." 

As Lopez notes, as early as the 18th century, Buddhist scholars like Tominaga Nakamoto (1715–1746) began to question this classical Buddhist cosmography, holding that they were adopted by the Buddha from Indian theories, but that they were incidental and thus not at the heart of Buddha's teaching. While some traditional Buddhists did defend the traditional cosmology, others like Shimaji Mokurai (1838–1911) argued that it was not foundational to Buddhism and was merely an element of Indian mythology. Others like Kimura Taiken (1881–1930), went further and argued that this traditional cosmography was not part of original Buddhism.

The issue of Mount Meru was also discussed by modern Buddhist intellectuals like Gendün Chöphel and the 14th Dalai Lama. According to Chöphel, the Meru cosmology is a provisional teaching taught in accord with the ideas of ancient India, but not appropriate for the modern era. Similarly, the 14th Dalai Lama writes that "my own view is that Buddhism must abandon many aspects of the Abhidharma cosmology". The Dalai Lama sees the falsehood of this traditional cosmology as not affecting the core of Buddhism (the teaching of the four noble truths and liberation) since it is "secondary to the account of the nature and origins of sentient beings".

See also
 Semeru — a mountain in Indonesia, named after Sumeru
 Mandala (Southeast Asian history)

References

Sources
Lopez Jr., Donald S. (2009). Buddhism and Science: A Guide for the Perplexed. University of Chicago Press.

External links
 Painting of Sumeru found in Buddhist cave sanctuary in Xinjiang
 Mount Meru According to the Abhidharmakośa (Huntington Archive)  Stūpa as Mount Meru (ibid.) 

Buddhist cosmology
Locations in Buddhist mythology
Mount Meru (mythology)
Locations in Chinese mythology